is a Japanese motorcycle racer. At national level he has competed in the GP250 and ST600 classes of the MFJ All Japan Road Race Championship. In 2010 he was signed by Bimota M Racing to replace Niccolò Canepa for the last races of the Moto2 World Championship season. In 2016 he made a wild card appearance in the Supersport World Championship; in 2017 he competed in the first five European rounds of the same series aboard a Honda CBR600RR.

Career statistics

Grand Prix motorcycle racing

By season

Races by year

Supersport World Championship

Races by year
(key) (Races in bold indicate pole position; races in italics indicate fastest lap)

References

External links

Living people
1981 births
Japanese motorcycle racers
Moto2 World Championship riders
Supersport World Championship riders